Sag Harbor is a sentimental comedy by American playwright James Herne. It inaugurated Oscar Hammerstein's Theatre Republic, the first Broadway theater on West 42nd Street, on September 27, 1900, starring the author as Capt. Dan Marble. Lionel Barrymore later took up the role

Notes

Plays by James Herne
1900 plays
Long Island in fiction
Plays set in New York (state)